Dongzhimen Subdistrict is a district on the northeastern side of Dongcheng District, Beijing, China. As of 2020, the subdistrict's total population is 46,712.

The subdistrict got its current name from Dongzhimen, a gate of the Beijing city wall that used to exist in this area.

History

Administrative Division 
As of 2021, there are 10 communities within the subdistrict:

Landmarks 

 Workers Indoor Arena

References

External links 
Official website

Dongcheng District, Beijing
Subdistricts of Beijing